The 1882 Prince Edward Island election was held on May 8, 1882 to elect members of the House of Assembly of the province of Prince Edward Island, Canada. It was won by the Conservative Party.

The election is currently listed on the website of Elections Prince Edward Island as taking place in 1883 — however, contemporaneous sources place the election in 1882.

Results

References
 

Elections in Prince Edward Island
1882 elections in Canada
1882 in Prince Edward Island
May 1882 events